Salto del Penitente (Spanish for Penitent's Waterfall) is a waterfall located in Lavalleja Department, Uruguay.

References

External links

 Salto del Penitente Park

Waterfalls of Uruguay